The women's  Freestyle Relay at the 2006 Central American and Caribbean Games occurred on Wednesday, July 19, 2006, at the S.U. Pedro de Heredia Aquatic Complex in Cartagena, Colombia.

Only 7 relays were entered in the event, and consequently, it was only swum once (in finals).

Records at the time of the event were:
World Record: 3:35.94,  Australia (Mills, Lenton, Thomas, Henry), Athens, Greece, August 14, 2004.
Games Record: 3:57.55,  Venezuela (Vilar, Lopes, Aponte, Semeco), 2002 Games in San Salvador (Nov.26.2002).

Results

References

2006 CAC results: Women's 4x100 Free Relay from the website of the 2006 Central American and Caribbean Games; retrieved 2009-07-11.

Freestyle Relay, Women's 4x100m
2006 in women's swimming